Les Barr (born 18 November 1952) is a Scottish former footballer, who played for Montrose and Dundee in the Scottish Football League.

Honours 
Dundee
 Scottish League Cup runner up: 1980
Montrose
 Scottish League Division Two: 1984–85

External links 

1952 births
Living people
Footballers from Dundee
Association football fullbacks
Association football wingers
Scottish footballers
Montrose F.C. players
Dundee F.C. players
Scottish Football League players
Place of birth missing (living people)